Gintaras Zelvys was a criminal born in Lithuania who was shot dead in Rathcoole, 2013.

He was a father of one.

Criminal history
He had convictions for rape, robbery and jailbreaking. In 2006 he was charged with unauthorised taking of a car in Kilcock and being a passenger in a stolen car. He was convicted of extortion against a fellow Lithuanian in 2007. He was deported in February 2013 after his release from Castlerea Prison but he returned to Ireland the weekend before he was shot.

Death
He and his wife arrived at his "cash for clothes" business on Grants Crescent in the Greenogue Industrial Estate outside Rathcoole on 1 May 2013.  The shooting happened around 9:30 am on 1 May 2013. The gunmen made their escape in a silver Audi A3. After he was shot he was taken to Tallaght University Hospital where he was declared dead.

Three men were arrested about his murder on 14 May 2013.

References

Deaths by firearm in the Republic of Ireland
2013 deaths
Lithuanian murder victims
Assassinated Lithuanian people